The 2019 Gander RV 400 was a Monster Energy NASCAR Cup Series race held on July 28, 2019 at Pocono Raceway in Long Pond, Pennsylvania. Contested over 163 laps—extended from 160 laps due to an overtime finish, on the  superspeedway, it was the 21st race of the 2019 Monster Energy NASCAR Cup Series season.

Entry list
 (i) denotes driver who are ineligible for series driver points.
 (R) denotes rookie driver.

Practice

First practice

Final practice

Qualifying

Qualifying results

 Note: Austin Dillon, Jimmie Johnson, William Byron, Michael McDowell, Ryan Blaney, Chris Buescher, Corey LaJoie, Ross Chastain, and Reed Sorenson all started at the back due to failing inspection and had their times disallowed and started based on owner points.

Race

Stage results

Stage One
Laps: 50

Stage Two
Laps: 50

Final stage results

Stage Three
Laps: 60

Race statistics
 Lead changes: 9 among 5 different drivers
 Cautions/Laps: 7 for 24
 Red flags: 0
 Time of race: 2 hours, 59 minutes and 22 seconds
 Average speed:

Media

Television
NBC Sports covered the race on the television side. NBC had a radio-style broadcast for the race similar to the Watkins Glen and Indianapolis races which had Rick Allen and Steve Letarte calling in the regular booth for the race; Motor Racing Network broadcaster Mike Bagley calling from Turn 1, Dale Earnhardt Jr. calling from Turn 2, and Jeff Burton calling from Turn 3. Dave Burns, Marty Snider and Kelli Stavast reported from pit lane during the race.

Radio
Motor Racing Network covered the radio call for the race, which was simulcast on Sirius XM NASCAR Radio. Jeff Striegle and A. J. Allmendinger called the race from the booth when the field raced down the front straightaway. Dave Moody called the action from turn 1, Kyle Rickey called the action when the field raced thru the tunnel turn, and Jason Toy called the action from turn 3. Winston Kelley, Steve Post, Kim Coon, & Glenn Jarrett will handle the pit road duties for MRN.

Standings after the race

Drivers' Championship standings

Manufacturers' Championship standings

Note: Only the first 16 positions are included for the driver standings.
. – Driver has clinched a position in the Monster Energy NASCAR Cup Series playoffs.

References

2019 Gander RV 400
2019 Monster Energy NASCAR Cup Series
2019 in sports in Pennsylvania
July 2019 sports events in the United States